Megachile familiaris is a species of bee in the family Megachilidae. It was described by Theodore Dru Alison Cockerell in 1916.

References

familiaris
Insects described in 1916